The Blacklisted Collection is the sixth studio album by Australian singer-songwriter Vanessa Amorosi. It was released on 26 June 2020 and is Amorosi's first independent release.

Background
The album consists of re-recorded songs or demos that were not included on previous albums. Amorosi told The Music Network "It's interesting why they might not have been included, didn't the sound work? Were the lyrics too intense? Didn't it make sense for them to be included on a pop record?" saying that releasing these was "so liberating for me because I'd been wanting to get these songs out for such a long time." It also includes some songs written and released within a week.

Promotion
The album was launched via an exclusive one night event, live streamed on 27 June 2020 via online platform Tix Presents. The Blacklisted Collection was preceded by nine singles, released weekly leading up to the album's release. Amorosi said "Now that we have released nine singles every Monday I can understand why it is not done. Because it is really hard."

Reception
Christie Eliezer from The Music Network said "The Blacklisted Collection is Amorosi's most compelling record to date, one which provides what she calls 'a missing link' to her art, and underlines her grasp for melodies and turning stories into narrative and anthemic arcs. The mood shifts from the radio-friendly '15,000 Revs' to the gorgeous sweet-grooved soul ballads 'Nobody Talks to You Like That' and 'The Last Goodbye' to the thrilling gospel workouts of 'The Light' and 'Sweet Mirage'".

Track listing

Charts

Release history

References

2020 albums
Vanessa Amorosi albums
Self-released albums